Glukhovskaya is a rural locality (a selo) in Sharovsky Selsoviet, Belebeyevsky District, Bashkortostan, Russia. The population was 93 as of 2010. There are 2 streets.

Geography 
Glukhovskaya is located 26 km southeast of Belebey (the district's administrative centre) by road. Bulanovka is the nearest rural locality.

References 

Rural localities in Belebeyevsky District